The Ministry of Public Safety and Solicitor General (PSSG) is a provincial government department in the Canadian province of British Columbia. Its primary responsibilities are overseeing the province's policing and correction services, as well as consumer protection.

The current minister is Mike Farnworth, since 2017.

History
The ministry was first established, as the Ministry of Solicitor General, on July 6, 1988, by the government of Premier Bill Vander Zalm. The solicitor general assumed responsibility for policing, the corrections system, the coroner's office, the Motor Vehicles Branch, Public Gaming Branch and the emergency program, all previously under the Attorney General of British Columbia. The creation was not without controversy; a week before the official announcement, Attorney General Brian Smith resigned from cabinet in protest, citing the planned split as a reason. Smith charged that the reason for the split was to weaken the attorney general's office and make it easier for the premier's office to control. In 1991, newly elected premier Mike Harcourt abolished the ministry and returned its responsibilities to the Ministry of Attorney General.

The ministry was re-created as the Ministry of Public Safety and Solicitor General on June 5, 2001, by Premier Gordon Campbell. In addition to regaining responsibility for policing, corrections, emergency management and gaming, the ministry gained responsibility for liquor control and licensing, the British Columbia Film Classification Office and landlord/tenant dispute resolution. On July 1, 2007, administration of the BCFCO was transferred to Consumer Protection BC.

On February 8, 2012, Premier Christy Clark merged the attorney general and solicitor general ministries to form a single Ministry of Justice and Attorney General. The move was part of an effort to reform and modernize the province's justice system. As part of the streamlining efforts, some of the duties of PSSG were not carried over to the justice ministry but transferred to other ministries: responsibility for the Public Sectors Employers Council and the Insurance Corporation of British Columbia were moved under the authority of the Ministry of Finance, and oversight of liquor and gaming went to the Ministry of Energy and Mines. Three years later, on December 12, 2015, Clark reversed course, restoring the Ministry of Public Safety and Solicitor General.

On December 7, 2022, Premier David Eby split emergency management into its own ministry, the Ministry of Emergency Management and Climate Readiness.

Portfolio

The Ministry of Public Safety and Solicitor General is one of two ministries, alongside the Ministry of Attorney General, that is responsible for the Government of British Columbia's administration of justice, protection of rights and delivery of public safety services. The specific responsibilities of the PSSG has included: policing and law enforcement; correctional services; victim services; coroners services; road safety; regulation of the liquor, cannabis and gaming sectors; and co-ordination of the emergency management system (via Emergency Management BC).

PSSG is additionally responsible for several agencies and boards: Consumer Protection BC, the Insurance Corporation of British Columbia, the Vehicle Sales Authority of British Columbia and municipal police boards.

List of ministers

See also
 Provincial correctional services in Canada#British Columbia

References

External links
 

British Columbia government departments and agencies
Law enforcement agencies of British Columbia
British Columbia
Emergency management in Canada
Solicitors general